Vincent Denne ( – October 1693) was an English politician who sat in the House of Commons in 1654 and from 1681 to 1685.

Denne was the son of Thomas Denne, of Canterbury and his wife Susan Honeywood, daughter of Arthur Honeywood of Lenham. He became a sergeant-at-law.

In 1656, Denne was elected Member of Parliament (MP) for Canterbury in the Second Protectorate Parliament. After the Restoration, he was again MP for Canterbury from 1681 to 1685.

Denne died in 1693 possessed of Denne Hill.

Denn married Mary Denne of Denne Hill and had four daughters.

References

1620s births
1693 deaths
Politics of Canterbury
Serjeants-at-law (England)
English MPs 1656–1658
English MPs 1681
Alumni of Queens' College, Cambridge